Argentine music band formed in 1981 by Uki Goñi, Marcelo O'Reilly, Ramiro Bustos Fierro and Chapete César.

Los Helicópteros recorded four LPs before their split-up in 1987, the first three on the Mercury label for PolyGram and the fourth with DBN.

The band ushered in a new era of pop music in Argentina (they defined their style as "Pep Music") that revolutionized the 1980s local music scene, starting with their monumental 1982 hit "Radio Venus" from their first LP Música Pep.

In 2005, the four original members released a fifth CD, Girasoles under the EPSA music label in Argentina.

Albums

References

External links
 Review of the band's CD Girasoles Rolling Stone magazine in Argentina 
 Interview with band leader Uki Goñi Argentine daily La Nación
 Official site

Argentine rock music groups
Rock en Español music groups
Musical groups established in 1981